"Romantic Homicide" is a song by American singer D4vd. It was released on July 20, 2022, through DistroKid. The song went viral on the app TikTok in September 2022, was rereleased through Darkroom and Interscope, and subsequently achieved commercial success.

Background
The 17-year-old Houston native first released the song in July 2022. By early September, the song had already been used in more than 245,000 clips on TikTok.

Composition
Accompanied by "heavy guitars" and "sentimental percussions", the song deals with unrequited love, as well as a breakup. While the song is characterized by its short lyrics, it was described as having a "more profound meaning".

Music video
The music video was released on September 7, 2022, and was inspired by the singer's love of the film noir genre and anime. Directed by Tommy Kiljo, it sees the singer mourning and moving on from a relationship.

Charts

Weekly charts

Year-end charts

Certifications

References

2022 singles
2022 songs
Interscope Records singles